"A Woman's Worth" is a song recorded by American singer-songwriter Alicia Keys for her debut studio album Songs in A Minor (2001). A soul-R&B ballad, it was written by Keys and Erika Rose and produced by Keys. The song was released as the second single from Songs in A Minor on September 25, 2001, by J Records, following the worldwide success of her debut single "Fallin'".

"A Woman's Worth" became another top-ten success for Keys in the United States, where it reached number seven on the Billboard Hot 100 and number three on the Hot R&B/Hip-Hop Songs. The accompanying music video for the song, directed by Chris Robinson, is a continuation of the video for "Fallin'" video and explores what happened when Keys' on-screen love interest got released from prison and tried to acclimate to society. The video was nominated for both Best R&B Video and Best Cinematography at the 2002 MTV Video Music Awards, while the song won an NAACP Image Award for Outstanding Song the same year.

Music video
The single's music video was directed by Chris Robinson and shot entirely in Brooklyn, New York. Its plot continues from Keys' previous video for "Fallin'" which revolves around Keys' travel to her imprisoned boyfriend. "A Woman's Worth" picks up where the previous video left, depicting his release from prison and tries to acclimate to society. The clip premiered on BET's 106 & Park on October 16, 2001.

Live performances
At the 2002 Grammy Awards ceremony, Keys performed both "Fallin'" and a tango-influenced version of "A Woman's Worth". On June 26, 2011, at the BET Awards, Keys performed the song as a duet with Bruno Mars.

Track listings and formats

European CD single
 "A Woman's Worth" (Original Radio Version) – 4:21
 "A Woman's Worth" (Remix Radio Version) – 4:28

European enhanced CD single
 "A Woman's Worth" – 5:05
 "A Woman's Worth" (Remix) – 4:45
 "A Woman's Worth" (Instrumental) – 5:11
 "A Woman's Worth" (Video)

European CD maxi-single
 "A Woman's Worth" (Original Radio Version) – 4:21
 "A Woman's Worth" (Remix Radio Version) – 4:28
 "A Woman's Worth" (Remix Club Version) – 4:28
 "A Woman's Worth" (Remix Instrumental Version) – 5:02
 "A Woman's Worth" (Video)

Australian CD maxi-single
 "A Woman's Worth" (Original Radio Version) – 4:21
 "A Woman's Worth" (Remix Radio Version) – 4:28
 "A Woman's Worth" (Remix Club Version) – 4:28
 "A Woman's Worth" (Remix Instrumental Version) – 5:02
 "Fallin" (Remix) (featuring Busta Rhymes and Rampage) – 3:35

European cassette single
A1. "A Woman's Worth" – 5:05
A2. "A Woman's Worth" (Remix) – 4:45
B1. "A Woman's Worth" – 5:05
B2. "A Woman's Worth" (Remix) – 4:45

US promotional CD
 "A Woman's Worth" (Radio Edit) – 4:10
 "A Woman's Worth" (Instrumental) – 4:10
 "A Woman's Worth" (Call Out Hook) – 0:10

US promotional CD (The Remix)
 "A Woman's Worth" (Radio Edit) – 4:28
 "A Woman's Worth" (Instrumental) – 5:02
 "A Woman's Worth" (Call Out Hook) – 0:10

US promotional 12-inch vinyl
A1. "A Woman's Worth" (Radio Mix) – 4:10
A2. "A Woman's Worth" (Instrumental) – 4:10
B1. "A Woman's Worth" (Radio Mix) – 4:10
B2. "A Woman's Worth" (Instrumental) – 4:10

US 12-inch single (The Remix)
A1. "A Woman's Worth" (Club Mix) – 4:28
A2. "A Woman's Worth" (Radio Mix) – 4:28
B1. "A Woman's Worth" (Instrumental) – 5:02
B2. "A Woman's Worth" (Acappella) – 4:25

European 12-inch single
A1. "A Woman's Worth" – 5:05
B1. "A Woman's Worth" (Remix) – 4:45
B2. "A Woman's Worth" (Instrumental) – 5:11

Personnel
Alicia Keys – producer, arranger, drum programming, lead vocals, backing vocals
Arty White – guitar
Paul L. Green – backing vocals
Manny Marroquin – mixing

Charts

Weekly charts

Year-end charts

Certifications

Release history

See also
 New Zealand Top 50 Singles of 2002

References

External links
 A Woman's Worth at Discogs

2000s ballads
2001 singles
Alicia Keys songs
Music videos directed by Chris Robinson (director)
Songs with feminist themes
Songs written by Alicia Keys
Sony Music Australia singles
Soul ballads